Burundi's Truth and Reconciliation Commission (TRC) (French: Commission vérité et réconciliation, CVR) is a truth and reconciliation commission established in the African country of Burundi to investigate crimes during ethnic conflict which started after the country became independent in 1962. The TRC arose from the Arusha Agreement of 2000. Established by the ruling CNDD-FDD party in 2014, the commission was intended to run for an initial four years; however, its terms of reference were extended for a further four years in 2018.

PierreClaver Ndayicariye is chairperson of the TRC. Clotilde Niragira was Secretary-General. She appointed an international advisory council in March 2016, which allowed the work of the commission to begin. Niragira's appointment to the commission ended in December 2018.

Massacres took place in 1965, 1969, 1972, 1988 and 1993. The commission implemented a programme to identify and exhume mass graves, identify victims and perpetrators where possible and re-bury bodies with appropriate funerals. The first mass grave was excavated in June 2017; a further 2,500 were estimated to exist in the country. Niragira promised to implement a system of compensation for the victims and their families. A report presented to parliament in early 2020 revealed that over 4,000 mass graves had been discovered, and 142,505 victims identified.  

Public opinion was divided upon its creation, and the Commission has since been criticised for not being impartial, but Ndayicariye says that criticisms are politically motivated.

See also
Ikiza
1993 ethnic violence in Burundi

References

Further reading

Truth and reconciliation commissions
2014 establishments in Burundi